The Baghdad Province was a province of the Safavid Empire, centred on the territory of the present-day Iraq. Baghdad was the provincial capital and the seat of the Safavid governors.

In October 1508, Shah Ismail entered into Baghdad. He appointed as governor of Iraq and Baghdad a certain Khadem Beg Talish. After the Shah took Baghdad, the city and its environs remained in Safavid hands until the Ottomans took the area in 1534 during the Campaign of the Two Iraqs.

Other names 
The Baghdad province later partly known as a Beglarbeglik under name of "Baghdad Beglarbeglik" nad sometimes called "Arabian Iraq Beglarbeglik" but In fact, Safavid territories of Arabian Iraq consisted of Diyarbakr and Baghdad provinces. Diyarbakr province fell to Ottomans in 1514 and only Baghdad province remained in the hands of Safavids.

History 
In summer 1508, Shah Ismail I (1501–1524) sent an envoy to Barik Beg Purnak, governor of Baghdad and Sultan Murad's commander-in-chief. Barik Beg declared his submission to Shah Ismail and his willingness to participate in the new order. Yet when Shah Ismail marched on Baghdad in person, Barik Beg and Sultan Murad fled to Aleppo. Entering the capital of Arabian Iraq in October 1508, Shah Ismail ordered the execution of all Purnak clansmen apprehended in the city. After abandoning Baghdad to the Safavids, Sultan Murad and Barik Beg tried without success to enlist the help of the Mamluk sultan Al-Ashraf Qansuh al-Ghuri against their enemies. With the Safavid takeover, many Persian merchants came to Baghdad and increased commercial activity.

Ebrahim Khan Kalhor, governor of Baghdad, was killed by his own nephew, the chief of the Kalhor Kurds, who seized Arabian Iraq. In 1530, Shah Tahmasp I (1524–1576) besieged and recaptured Baghdad, appointing Sharaf al-Din Sultan as governor of Baghdad. In December 1534, Ottoman sultan Suleiman I (1520–1566) conquered Baghdad in Campaign of the Two Iraqs. On Tahmasp's order, his governor of Baghdad left the city for Basra. His deputies presented the key of the city gate to Sultan Suleiman, and thenceforth Baghdad and Arabian Iraq became a dominion of the Ottoman empire, except for brief interludes of Iranian occupation under Abbas I (1588–1629) and Nader Shah (1736–1747).

The Safavids managed to reclaim Baghdad in early 17th century. In January 1624, they conquered Baghdad at the beginning of the 1623–1639 war. Safavids defended against Ahmed Pasha's 1625–1626 campaign and Hüsrev Pasha's 1630 campaign but finally in December 1638, Baghdad was retaken by Sultan Murad IV (1623–1640) and subsequently the peace treaty was signed. In 1624, when Safiqoli Khan became the new governor, he built a Saray (governmental house) in Baghdad. Furthermore, after the death of Safiqoli, when Bektash Khan, his maternal uncle, succeeded him made considerable repairs to the Baghdad's fortifications that were damaged in the previous sieges. He also built extensive outworks to prevent the enemy from approaching the walls of the city.

Administration 
The Baghdad province was consisted of Hilla, Ramadiyeh, Wasit, Kirkuk, Mandali, Zahab and other subordinate districts. Najaf, Karbala, Kazemeyn and Samarra were the important cities of the province. Aftermore, Jastan district was a dependency of the Baghdad province.

The governor also was Amir al-umara (commander-in-chief) of the province.

Mint 
There was a mint in Baghdad in which gold, silver and copper coins were struck.

List of governors 
 Khadem Beg Talish (1508–?)
 Seyyed Suleiman (before 1518)
 Ebrahim Khan Kalhor (?–1528)
 Zu'l-Faqar Khan Kalhor (1528–1529) (usurper)
 Ali Beg Mawsillu (1528–1529)
 Mohammad Khan Takkalu (Sharaf al-Din Sultan) (1529–1534)

Footnotes

Notes

References

Sources 

 
 
 
 
 
 
 
 
 
 
 

Early Modern history of Iraq
Provinces of the Safavid dynasty
States and territories established in 1508
1508 establishments in Asia
States and territories disestablished in the 1530s
1534 disestablishments
1530s disestablishments in Asia